In the Solomon Islands, the waters between the Florida Islands and Taivu Point on the northeast of Guadalcanal are divided by reefs into (from north to south) Nggela Channel, Sealark Channel, and Lengo Channel. They connect Ironbottom Sound to the west with Indispensable Strait to the east.

The Lengo Channel is navigatable by large ships and was traversed by Task Force 67 (TF67) during the Battle of Tassafaronga and by other ships during the Guadalcanal Campaign.

Notes
Citations

References

Straits of the Solomon Islands